RNA Modification Base (RMBase) is designed for decoding the landscape of RNA modifications identified from high-throughput sequencing data (MeRIP-seq, m6A-seq, miCLIP, m6A-CLIP, Pseudo-seq, Ψ-seq, CeU-seq, Aza-IP, RiboMeth-seq). It contains ~124200 N6-Methyladenosines (m6A), ~9500 pseudouridine (Ψ) modifications, ~1000 5-methylcytosine (m5C) modifications, ~1210 2′-O-methylations (2′-O-Me) and ~3130 other types of RNA modifications. RMBase demonstrated thousands of RNA modifications located within mRNAs, regulatory ncRNAs (e.g. lncRNAs, miRNAs, pseudogenes, circRNAs, snoRNAs, tRNAs), miRNA target sites and disease-related SNPs.

See also
 RNA modification database
 RNA modification

References

External links
 http://rna.sysu.edu.cn/rmbase/

Genetics databases
RNA
MicroRNA
LncRNA